Father Bressani Catholic High School is a high school in Woodbridge, Ontario, Canada operated by the York Catholic District School Board. It offers the Advanced Placement Program.

Feeder schools
 St. John Bosco
 St. Gabriel
 Immaculate Conception Catholic Elementary School
 St. Gregory the Great
 St. Clare of Assisi
 St. Frances of Assisi

Notable alumni

David Rocco, television personality
Dina Pugliese is the co-host of Citytv Toronto's Breakfast Television
Robert Barbieri international Rugby Player for Italy and Benneton Treviso
Mark Cundari, professional hockey player currently with the  EC VSV organization.

See also
List of high schools in Ontario

References

York Catholic District School Board
High schools in the Regional Municipality of York
Catholic secondary schools in Ontario
Educational institutions established in 1983
1983 establishments in Ontario